Many Many Voices is a live hörspiel by Roberto Paci Dalò and Isabella Bordoni, broadcast from the Haus der Kulturen der Welt, Berlin, on January 29 1995. Produced for Sender Freies Berlin, Kunstradio, RNE, YLE, Giardini Pensili.

Reception
 
-Giampiero Cane, Il Manifesto 9.1.1998

-Kunstradio 9.2.1995

Track listing
All songs written and directed by Roberto Paci Dalò and Isabella Bordoni.

Personnel 
Roberto Paci Dalò - composer, conductor, sampler, clarinet, voice, electronics
David Moss - percussion, voice 
Isabella Bordoni - dramaturgy, voice 
Anna Clementi - voice
Jean-Marc Montera - electric guitar, voice 
Horst Hörtner - electronics & system design, artistical collaboration
Claudio Jacomucci - accordion 

Susanne Burkhardt - assistant direction 
Patrizio Esposito - artistical collaboration 
Isabella Bordoni, Roberto Paci Dalò - liner notes 
Sabine Breitsameter - dramaturgy consultant 
Oreste Zevola - illustration, drawings 
K-PLEX Berlin - design

References 

1995 live albums